The 2013 European Junior and U23 Canoe Slalom Championships took place in Bourg-Saint-Maurice, France from 31 July to 4 August 2013 under the auspices of the European Canoe Association (ECA). It was the 15th edition of the competition for Juniors (U18) and the 11th edition for the Under 23 category. A total of 19 medal events took place. No medals were awarded for the junior women's C1 team event due to low number of participating countries.

Medal summary

Men

Canoe

Junior

U23

Kayak

Junior

U23

Women

Canoe

Junior

U23

Kayak

Junior

U23

Medal table

References

External links
European Canoe Association

European Junior and U23 Canoe Slalom Championships
European Junior and U23 Canoe Slalom Championships